The Bellefonte and Snow Shoe Railroad was a coal-hauling railroad in Centre County, Pennsylvania. Begun in 1859, it came under the control of the Pennsylvania Railroad in 1881. Closing of mines in the 1930s resulted in the decline of traffic on the railroad, which was abandoned in 1959.

Origins and construction
The line was originally chartered as the Allegheny and Bald Eagle Railroad, Coal and Iron Company on June 12, 1839. It was to extend from the western side of the Allegheny Mountains to Bald Eagle Creek. For many years, however, it showed no organized activity, although the Pennsylvania General Assembly periodically renewed its charter. On May 2, 1855, a charter supplement allowed it to extend to Bellefonte, to connect with the Bald Eagle and Spring Creek Navigation canal. In 1857, a survey of the line was finally completed. Construction began in 1858, and it was completed in 1859, from the coal mines at Snow Shoe to Snow Shoe Intersection (now Wingate) in the Bald Eagle Valley. There it connected with the west end of the newly constructed Tyrone and Lock Haven Railroad, which ran up the valley to Milesburg and then south to Bellefonte, and over which it had trackage rights.

The name of the company was changed to the Bellefonte and Snowshoe Railroad Company on March 24, 1859, shortly before a ceremonial opening on 21 June 1859, featuring a special train from Bellefonte to Clarks, then the terminus of the line. It would be extended to Snow Shoe later in the year, and regular passenger service begun in December.

Independent operation

The railroad's operations began at Bellefonte, site of coal-hungry iron furnaces and the head of navigation on the Bald Eagle & Spring Creek canal. Using the tracks of the Tyrone and Lock Haven, it passed north through the narrow valley of Spring Creek to reach the Bald Eagle Valley at Milesburg. The Tyrone and Lock Haven was intended to stretch north up the valley to Lock Haven and south to Tyrone, but only a little grading had been accomplished north of Milesburg or south of Wingate, where the Bellefonte & Snow Shoe turned onto its own tracks. It followed the valley of Wallace Run through Gum Stump, and, at the forks of Wallace Run, climbed the side of a mountain by a series of switchbacks. The line continued climbing through Rhoads following the edges of the Jonathan Run and South Fork Beech Creek gorges, crossing the latter and winding through Fountain to reach Snow Shoe.

As new mines opened up in the region, extensions to the railroad began to be built. A line built in 1861 from Snow Shoe north, then west to Gillintown and Moshannon (also known as Per Se) was incorporated on April 11, 1863 as the Moshannon Railroad, and appears to have been operated as part of the Bellefonte and Snow Shoe, adding  to that road.

In the meantime, the Pennsylvania Railroad had taken control of the Tyrone and Lock Haven, reorganized in 1861 as the Bald Eagle Valley Railroad, and begun to extend it up and down the valley. In 1863, it was completed south from Wingate to Vail, where it reached the PRR-controlled Tyrone and Clearfield Railroad, and in 1865, the line was finished from Milesburg to Lock Haven.

The Bellefonte & Snow Shoe continued to improve its physical plant, stringing a telegraph line from Snow Shoe to Wingate in 1869. In 1871, the directors resolved to construct a branch from Bellefonte to the vicinity of Oak Hall to connect with the Lewisburg, Centre and Spruce Creek Railroad when it reached that point. However, the financial difficulties of the latter long delayed its construction, and while the link would be built (as the Bellefonte, Nittany and Lemont Railroad), it would not be the Bellefonte & Snow Shoe that would construct it.

A serious wreck occurred on the railroad on June 11, 1878, when the Miller's Spring Trestle collapsed under the southbound mixed train from Snow Shoe to Bellefonte and it fell  into a ravine. One passenger was killed, and two passengers and four crewmen were injured.

Snow-Shoe Branch

The Bellefonte & Snow Shoe ended its independent operation in January 1881, when it was sold to the Bald Eagle Valley Railroad, long a subsidiary of the PRR. The Bellefonte & Snow Shoe and the Moshannon Railroads were merged into the Bald Eagle Valley on April 7, 1881 to become the Snow-Shoe Branch.

Several new branches were built off the line under Bald Eagle Valley management to reach nearby coal mines. Two were constructed in 1890. The Fountain Branch was built in 1903,  in length,  crossing the Beech Creek Railroad to serve Lehigh Valley Coal Co. #14 Mine.

On March 31, 1908, the Bald Eagle Valley Railroad was at last merged into the PRR, including the Snow-Shoe and other branches. The PRR would construct a few more mine branches, extending the Sugar Camp Branch  in 1914 and 1915. The extension continued east out of Clarence, then climbed steeply north to Poorman Side, then descended along Contrary Run and (Big) Sandy Run to Cherry Run #4 Mine of the Big Sandy Coal Company near Shettleston. The Big Sandy Branch, built in 1915, left the Sugar Camp Branch along Big Sandy Run and climbed out of its valley and along that of an unnamed tributary, extending  to Lehigh Valley Coal Co. #25 Mine.

However, the railroad was soon to pass into a decline. The Fountain branch had already been removed by 1923. The Great Depression caused the closure of most of the coal mines in the area, and the Big Sandy Branch was abandoned in 1935. A fire brick manufacturer near Clarence and the remaining coal mines still provided some business to the line, but the mine branches continued to be pruned back. On March 6, 1959, the entire line from Wingate north was abandoned.

References

External links
Description of the Bellefonte and Snow Shoe
Account of a trip over the railroad in 1865

Defunct Pennsylvania railroads
Predecessors of the Pennsylvania Railroad
Transportation in Centre County, Pennsylvania
Railway companies established in 1859
Railway companies disestablished in 1881
1859 establishments in Pennsylvania